Malhar L Patel (born 27 November 1983) is a former Kenyan cricketer. A right-handed middle order batsman, he made his One Day International debut in the 2004 Champions Trophy match versus Pakistan at Edgbaston in Birmingham.

External links

1983 births
Living people
Kenyan cricketers
Kenyan people of Indian descent
Kenya One Day International cricketers
Western Chiefs cricketers
Kenyan Hindus
Gujarati people
Kenyan people of Gujarati descent